Gérard Philippe Berry (born 25 December 1948) is a French computer scientist, member of the French Academy of Sciences (Académie des sciences), French Academy of Technologies (Académie des technologies), and Academia Europaea. He was the Chief Scientist Officer of Esterel Technologies from 2000 to 2009. He held the 2007-2008 yearly Liliane Bettencourt chair of Technological Innovation at the Collège de France. He was Director of Research at INRIA Sophia-Antipolis and held the 2009-2010 yearly Informatics and Digital Sciences chair at the Collège de France. Berry's work, which spans over more than 30 years, brought important contributions to three main fields:
 lambda calculus and functional programming
 parallel and real-time programming languages
 design automation for synchronous digital circuits

Berry is known for the Esterel programming language.

References

External links

 Personal home page at INRIA —
 Courses at Collège de France

 Short presentation — French Academy of Sciences web site:
 Biography —  Annales des Mines
 Decree JORF #176, 08/01/2007, p12944, text #54: Pr. Berry appointed Associate Professor at Collège de France

Bibliography

 Gérard Berry, L'Hyperpuissance de l'informatique : algorithmes, données, machines, réseaux, Odile Jacob, 2017
 Gérard Berry, L'Informatique du temps et des événements, Fayard, Paris, 2013.
 Gérard Berry, Penser, modéliser et maîtriser le calcul informatique, Fayard, Paris, 2008
 Gérard Berry, Pourquoi et comment le monde devient numérique ?, Fayard, Paris, 2008.

1948 births
Academic staff of the Collège de France
Living people
French computer scientists
Members of Academia Europaea
Members of the French Academy of Sciences
École Polytechnique alumni